Peter Thomas Finn (1827/1828 – 1 April 1911) was a barrister in Victoria, Australia and Invercargill, New Zealand. For a short time, he was a member of the Victorian Legislative Assembly for the electorate of Avoca.

Biography
Finn was born in Ireland in either 1827 or 1828. Hugh Finn was a younger brother. He commenced his tertiary education at Queen's College, Galway, Ireland. He emigrated to Victoria in the 1850s and matriculated into the University of Melbourne in 1857, obtaining his BA in the following year and his MA in 1874.

In 1859, he was admitted as a barrister to the Supreme Court of Victoria, practising in Melbourne and Ballarat. On 25 July 1870, he was elected to the Victorian Legislative Assembly in a by-election following the resignation of James Macpherson Grant. He served from October 1870 until January 1871, when he was defeated by Grant at the 1871 election. Finn had previously unsuccessfully stood for election in Avoca (1861). Subsequently, he was unsuccessful in Grenville (1871) and St Kilda (1872).

Finn sailed to Invercargill in 1876 and had entered a law partnership with Richard Matthews by February 1877. From 1880 until 1889, he was in partnership with Robert Henry Rattray.

He married Rosa Helen Champ, daughter of Colonel Champ from Darra in Victoria, on 6 March 1878 at Invercargill. She died on 13 June 1885, aged 37, and was buried at Invercargill's Saint John's Cemetery.

He himself considered contesting the  electorate in the Lake District, but stood back in favour of his brother, who was successful.

Returning to Victoria in around 1890, he briefly practised law in Melbourne and Ballarat before moving to Geelong. His remaining years were spent in Meredith. He died on 1 April 1911 at Fitzroy, probably at St Vincent's Hospital. He was survived by one son who, at the time of Finn's death, lived in Perth.

References

1820s births
1911 deaths
Members of the Victorian Legislative Assembly
People from Invercargill
Irish emigrants to colonial Australia
19th-century New Zealand lawyers
Australian barristers
Year of birth missing